Nabhaan Rizwan (born November 30, 1996) is a British actor known for crime drama Informer, his supporting roles in The Accident and 1917, and the miniseries Station Eleven. Rizwan is originally from Essex and now lives in London.

Early life 

Rizwan's mother, Shahnaz, was a child actress and also starred in Indian soap opera Yeh Hai Mohabbatein as an adult in the role of Santosh "Toshi" Bhalla. His father was a playwright and his brother, Mawaan, is an actor, writer and comedian. Rizwan grew up in Ilford and was initially more interested in playing cricket than acting. After completing A-Levels, he did youth work and acted in theatre groups. His audition for Informer was one of his first auditions.

Filmography

Film

Television

Theatre

References

External links

Living people
British male television actors
British male film actors
British male actors of South Asian descent
People from Ilford
1997 births